Koyelaanchal is a 2014 Indian Hindi-language film produced and directed by Ashu Trikha, starring Vinod Khanna, Suniel Shetty, Vipinno and Roopali Krishnarao. A story that losts its track at every step..

Plot
Koyelaanchal unveils itself through Saryu Bhan Singh, an ex-owner turned Mafioso of the region, who through his sheer brutality & blatant defiance of law of the land, forces the people & the authorities to acknowledge him as their ‘maalik’. Any protest, any voice of dissent against him is dealt with spine chilling violence of epic proportions.

Things get a bit difficult to handle for Saryu Bhan Singh when an upright District Collector Nisheeth Kumar takes charge of the region and starts asking him questions that no one dared ask him before. Caught amidst labor revolts & naxal uprisings, the last thing Saryu Bhan Singh wanted was to make enemies with the top government officer of his region. He sends his most lethal human weapon, Karua to scare Nisheeth Kumar off to silence.
 
But the mission don't-kill-just-scare-him goes horribly wrong when Karua ends up injuring Nisheeth's wife and in the process of escape, ends up carrying Nisheeth's infant also, thus abducting the child. What happens hereafter tells a thrilling & heart-rending story of how the real power doesn't always flow through the barrels of guns but through the tender touches of a child, the love of a mother & the heartfelt prayers of the hapless millions.

Cast
 Vinod Khanna as Saryu Bhan Singh aka Maalik
 Suniel Shetty as Nisheeth Kumar
 Vipinno as Karua
Rupali Krishnarao as Roopmati
Purva Parag
Deepraj Rana
Brij Gopaleee
Kannan Arunachalam as Kannan Iyer (cop from Intelligence Bureau)
Ravi Singh as Bhushan & Puran
Biswanath Basu  as Ghosh Babu 
 Lata S Singh as Mrs. Ghosh
Himayat Ali
Chitragupta sinha as chacha 
Ranjit as Bhatija 
Master Manjeet Singh
Raman Gupta

Soundtrack

Critical reception

Koyelaanchal received mixed reviews from the critics. Taran Adarsh of Bollywood Hungama rated 3 stars mentioning it as an absorbing and engaging film. Film Critic Subhash K. Jha gave it 3 stars and said that Koyelaanchal has a plot that reads like pulp fiction but feels like a slice of ugly Indian history. Film Critic Joginder Tuteja has also given it 3 stars and termed it "Different And Unconventional". Noyon Jyoti Parasara of NowRunning however called it a "Flawed, half-hearted and half-baked", rating it 1.5 stars.

References

 http://www.bollywoodhungama.com/moviemicro/cast/id/732588

External links
 
 Koyelaanchal on Facebook
 Koyelaanchal on Twitter

2014 films
2010s Hindi-language films
2014 crime action films
Indian crime action films
Films set in Jharkhand
Films directed by Ashu Trikha